"Craise Finton Kirk Royal Academy of Arts" is a song by the Bee Gees on the album Bee Gees' 1st. Written by Barry and Robin Gibb, it closes the first side of the album. An alternate take was released in 2006 on The Studio Albums 1967-1968. This track was recorded on March 21 after the orchestral dubbing for the other album tracks had been laid down. Featuring only piano and voice, the song stands in stark contrast to the rest of the album.

Personnel
 Robin Gibb — lead and harmony vocal
 Maurice Gibb — piano
 Robert Stigwood — producer
 Ossie Byrne — producer

Johnny Young version
Later, it was covered by Australian singer Johnny Young, a friend of the Bee Gees. His version was recorded in July 1967 at IBC Studios, and Barry, Robin and Maurice sang backup. The track was conducted by Bill Shepherd and produced by Robert Stigwood. It was issued as a single on Polydor Records in UK and Clarion Records in Australia, in August 1967. The B-side was another Bee Gees song "I Am the World", written by Robin Gibb in 1966.

Young's version of this song had been on the Radio London playlist for the final four weeks of the station's life. The song was one of the most popular tracks featured on Big L'97. Mike Ahern cited this track as "being on Caroline's pay-for-play list".  The song reached #14 at the Go-Set charts in Melbourne and on Kent Music Report in Sydney.

Chart performance

References

Bee Gees songs
1967 songs
Songs written by Barry Gibb
Songs written by Robin Gibb
Song recordings produced by Robert Stigwood
1967 singles
Johnny Young songs
Polydor Records singles